Archaeocryptography (from Greek , arkhaios, "ancient" and  (kruptós), "hidden, secret"; and  (graphein), "to write") is the study of decoding a monument or structure by determining the underlying mathematical order beneath the proportions, size, and placement to find any re-occurring or unusual data in respect to that which is being studied, or within another monument or structure.

Archaeocryptography is not a recognized branch of archaeology or of any other academic discipline. It is an example of pseudoscience or pseudoarchaeology that employs contrived calculations involving many free parameters to achieve an impressive-looking result.

Description 
The word archaeocryptography is derived from archaeology, which is the study of human activity in the past, and cryptography, which is the study of techniques for secure communication in the presence of third parties.

Methods 
Archaeocryptologists try to find underlying correlations in respect that which is being studied or decoded. Some factors taken into consideration while deciphering an object, structure or megalithic monument can include the features such as faces, stairs, sides, and terraces.  The geolocation or mathematical operations are performed on latitude and longitude coordinates as well as astronomical alignments, such as are found with archaeoastronomy. The incorporation of grids, the use of numerical ordering, mathematical constants, Biblical gematria, and any other re-occurring number that might stand out from the decoding process are determining factors.

Archaeocryptologists then can use different mathematical formulas to find correlations within that which is being studied or between other monuments or structures that share any underlying factors. Popular examples are the Orion correlation theory between the Giza pyramid complex and the three middle stars of the constellation Orion, and also theories about the region of Cydonia on Mars.

History 
The coining of the word archaeocryptography is often attributed to Carl P. Munck, who after retiring from the United States military in the late 1970s began studying cartographic material, among other topics, trying to search for better answers as to why certain megalithic monuments exist. This led him to a formula he believes architects used to place and design various megalithic monuments. Munck's theory claims that calculations using selected numbers or dimensions found in megalithic monuments or Egyptian pyramids yield the latitude or longitude of the site. However, in Munck's findings, the prime meridian does not run through Greenwich, but through the Great Pyramid in Giza. His theory is known simply as "The Code" and asserts that an ancient numerological system known as gematria is used in the manipulation of numbers to other key locations, mathematical components and positions of sites in the geometry of their construction.

The theory later become popularized and among other practitioners and researchers in pseudo-scientific fields, such as Michael Lawrence Morton, Richard C. Hoagland, Bruce Cathie, and Hugh Harleston Jr. They adapted archaeocryptography to their own studies, developing different theories  and books  based on the topic.

In literary studies 
The marginal, or even fictional, status of archaeocryptography was suggested in Zachary Mason's novel The Lost Books of the Odyssey, which purports to be a collection of lost works which the author describes as being as old as the Odyssey and which he claims to have decoded from a manuscript he had uncovered. In the author's biography at the conclusion of the book he describes himself as "the John Shade Professor of Archaeocryptography and Paleomathematics at Magdalen College, Oxford". The "lost books" were actually written by Mason and, as reviewers have noted, Mason is a novelist and computer scientist who lives in California, John Shade is a fictional poet in Vladimir Nabokov's Pale Fire, and no such professorship exists.

See also 

 Pyramid (geometry)
 Geometry
 Metrology
 Numerology
 Cartography
 Paleomagnetism
 Geomathematics
 Geotargeting
 Global Positioning System

References

External links 
 "The Code" by Carl Munck
 "The Giza Pyramids as a Stellar Representation of Orion's Belt" by Robert Bauval

Pseudoarchaeology